Visible Wings is the 7th album by Taiwanese Mandopop singer Angela Chang, the first under her new label Wonderful Music, released on 12 October 2012 in three formats: CD only, CD+DVD (with a poster) and a Preorder version (with a 2013 calendar).

Track listing

Charts

Release History

References

External links
 G-Music Profile: Preorder Version | CD+DVD | CD Only 
 Music Videos:  //  //  //  //  // 

2012 albums
Mandarin-language albums
Angela Chang albums